This is an incomplete list of the names and nicknames of flags, organized in alphabetical order by flag name. Very few flags have any truly official names, but some unofficial names are so widely used that they are accepted as a flag's universal name.

A
  ("The Gold and Green"), Brazil
  ("The red"), Greenland
  ("Support flag"), Qatar
  ("My country's flag"), Kuwait
  ("Colourful flag"), Iraqi Kurdistan
  ("Red Flag"), Turkey
  ("Holy Red Standard"), Turkey
  ("Crescent Star"), Turkey
  or La Celeste y Blanca ("The white and light blue one"), Argentina
  ("The Two Stars"), Syria

B
  ("Gold and green flag"), Brazil
  ("Flag of the quinas", the five blue shields of the Portuguese arms), Portugal
  ("Green-Red Flag"), Portugal
  ("Flag of Saint David"), Wales (unofficial flag)
  ("St. Piran's flag"), Cornwall
 , California
  ("Red-White Flag"), Indonesia
 , United States
  ("The Saffron Banner"), Flag of the Hindus and former flag of the Maratha Empire
  ("White-Red"), Poland
  ("White-Red-White"), former flag of Belarus
 , Austria
 , Jamaica
 , Confederate States
  ("Flag of the Star and the Crescent"), Libya
  Bonnie Blue Flag, official flag of the now-defunct Republic of West Florida, also used in some places as an unofficial banner of the Confederate States.
  ("Bosnian lily"), former flag of Bosnia and Herzegovina
  ("Saltire"), Scotland
 , Barbados
  ("Federal Flag"), Germany, official designation
 /Balgarski Trikolyor ("Bulgarian Three Colors"), Bulgaria

C
  ("The light blue one"), Uruguay
 , Australia
  ("St. Andrew's Cross"), Scotland
  ("Red Flag and Yellow Star"), Vietnam
  ("Flag of Fatherland"), Vietnam
  ("Occitan cross"), Occitania
 , European Union and the Council of Europe
 , Jamaica

D
  ("Danish cloth"), Denmark
  ("My Nation/Land"), Kuwait

E
  ("Our flag"), Greenland
  ("The Lone Star"), Chile,
  ("The Lone Star"), Cuba
  ("Blue-Starred Flag"), Catalan separatism
 , Australia

F
 , Jain flag
  ("Fleur-de-lis-y"), Quebec, Canada

G
  ("Light blue and white"), Greece
 , Guyana
  ("White and black"), Brittany
 , United States
 , United States

H
  ("Sun disc"), Japan (national flag and naval flag)
  ("The White-blue"), a flag proposal which was used but never became official, Iceland

I
  ("Imperial flag"), Russian Empire (historical flag)

J
 , Confederate States
  ("Stripes of Glory"), Malaysia
 , Jefferson (proposed U.S. state)

K
  Kanaka Maoli ("True People"), Hawaii (alternative flag)
  Kaponga (silver fern), New Zealand (unofficial, widely used)
  ("Dagger and two swords"), Oman
  ("Five-cross flag"), Georgia
  ("Red Banner"), Soviet Union (historical flag)
  ("Blue Banner"), East Turkestan
  ("Black, white, red, white, green and a shield with two arrows"), Kenya

L
 {{flagof|Bangladesh|name=Lal-Sobuj', 'Lal-Sobuj er Nishan'}} ("Red & green"), Bangladesh
  Leòmhann na h-Alba ("Lion Rampant"), Scotland
 , Texas
 , Sri Lanka

M
  or l'Unifolié, Canada
  ("The Banner"), Faroe Islands
  ("Red and White"), Indonesia

N
  Native America's flag, Oklahoma
  Nishan Sahib ("Holy flag"/"Exalted banner"), Sikh flag
  ("Sun-mark flag"), Japan

O
 , United States

P
  ("Mountain"), Nepal
  ("Flag of the Star and the Crescent"), Pakistan
  Prinsenvlag ("Prince's flag"), Netherlands (historical)
  ("Red-White-Green"), Hungary
  ("National Flag"), Philippines

Q
  (Qīng Tiān, Bái Rì, Mǎn Dì Hóng ["Blue Sky, White Sun, Red Field"]), Taiwan

R
  (all unofficial), South Africa
  Rainbow flag, there are several independent rainbow flags in use today, the most widely known worldwide is the pride flag representing gay pride, while the peace flag is especially popular in Italy and the cooperative flag symbolizes the international co-operative movement.
 , United States
  ("Indigo and Red Flag of the Republic"), North Korea
 , the civil ensign of the United Kingdom
 ("Royal flag"), Valencia
  (Rosiiski Trikolor) ("Russian Three Colours"), Russia
  ("Red-weld"), Spain
  ("Red-white-red"), Austria
  ("Red Lion"), civil ensign of Luxembourg
  (Ručnik), Belarus
  (Red, white and blue), Norway

S
  ("Green Flag with Crescent"), Pakistan
 , Scotland
  Saint George's Cross, England
 , Devon
  ("Tricolor"), Laos
  ("Red-white-red flag"), Latvia
  ("The Red White Heritage"), Indonesia
  ("Sun of Kutleš'), Republic of Macedonia (historical flag)
  ("Black-red-gold"), Germany
  Schwarz-Weiß-Rot ("Black-white-red"), German Empire
  ('"Tricolor"), Iran
 , Alghero and Catalonia
  ('The lion and the sun"), Iran (historical flag)
  ("The two-headed eagle"), Albania
  ("Blue-black-white"), Estonia
  ("Blue Cross Flag"), Finland
  ("Lion Flag"), Sri Lanka
 , Tibet
 , Confederate States (other meanings)
 , Australia
 , New Zealand
 , Confederate States
 , Confederate States
 , United States
 , United States

T
 , South Korea
  ("Three Stars and a Sun"), Philippines
  Al Tawheed/Shahada, Saudi Arabia
 , flag of the United Tribes of New Zealand
  ("Absolute Sovereignty"), national Māori flag (New Zealand)
  ("The Tricolour"), India
 , state flag of Iceland
  ("Tricolour"), Thailand
  ("Three Legs of Mann"), Isle of Man
 Tricolor or similar, a term for several national flags which are tribands or tricolours:
  ("The Tricolor"), Bolivia
  ("The National Tricolor"), Colombia
 , Costa Rica
  ("The Tricolor"), Croatia
 , Ecuador
  ("National Tricolour"), Venezuela
 , Second Spanish Republic (historical)
  ("Tricolour Flag"), France
 , Italy
 , Romania
  (Trikolor), Russia
  / Trobojka, Serbia
  ("Irish tricolour"), Ireland
 , Sicily
  ("Tricolor"), Lithuania
 , Antarctica

U
  ("Tricolour Flag"), Azerbaijan
  ("The [one] with a single Leaf"), Canada
  L'Union Fait La Force ("Unity makes strength"), motto on the flag of Haiti
  or Union Flag, United Kingdom
 , United States

W
  Wiphala, a flag representing the native peoples of the Andes and the co-official flag of Bolivia
   (Wǔ Xīng Hóng Qí) ("Five-Starred Red Flag"), People's Republic of China

Y
  ("The Red Dragon"), Wales
  (Yerakooyn) ("Tricolour"), Armenia

Z
  (Zhovto-blakytnyy [prapor]'') ("Yellow-blue [flag]"), Ukraine

Notes

References

 Names
flag names